Danny Battochio (born December 21, 1985) is a Canadian former professional ice hockey goaltender. He retired playing with the Rapid City Rush of the ECHL and is a goalie consultant.

Playing career
Battochio played major junior hockey with the Ottawa 67's of the Ontario Hockey League (OHL) where he was twice selected to receive the Roger Neilson Memorial Award as the OHL's top academic College/University player, and also winning the Bobby Smith Trophy as the OHL Scholastic Player of the Year for the 2005–06 season.

Battochio then attended St. Francis Xavier University where he played Canadian Interuniversity Sport (CIS) hockey within the Atlantic University Sport (AUS) conference. He was recognized for his outstanding play when he was named to the 2008-09 AUS Second All-Star Team.

Battochio turned professional with the 2009–10 Rapid City Rush of the Central Hockey League (CHL), where as a rookie he helped his team capture the Ray Miron President's Cup as the 2009–10 CHL champions. He was also selected as the CHL's Rookie of the Year and was named to the 2009–10 CHL All-Rookie Team.

In June 2013, Battochio was signed by the Beibarys Atyrau to play the 2013–14 season in Kazakhstan.

After a solid season with Atyrau, Battochio opted to return to his original club, the Rapid City Rush on a one-year deal on August 21, 2014.

Awards and honours

Personal life 
, Battochio works in a mortgage brokerage in America.

References

External links
 

1985 births
Living people
Beibarys Atyrau players
Canadian ice hockey goaltenders
Ice hockey people from Ontario
Ottawa 67's players
Rapid City Rush players
St. Francis Xavier University alumni
Sportspeople from Greater Sudbury